This is a list of equipment currently in service in the Royal Danish Army.

Weapons

Bayonet, field knife, and entrenching tool

Pistols

Assault rifles

Machine guns

Sniper rifles

Anti-tank weapons

Grenade launchers

Indirect fire weapons

Grenades and mines
 Håndgranat M/54 (540 grams fragmentation hand grenade)
 Røghåndgranat M/57 (phosphor based grenade)
 Røghåndbombe M/77 (phosphor based grenade)
 Røghåndbombe M/93 (phosphor based grenade)
 M/05 Flashbang device
 M/05 Sting hand grenade
 M/05 CS gas hand grenade
 Alarmmine M/87 (Alarm mine, pyrotechnics)
 Alarmblus M/62 (Alarm mine, pyrotechnics)

Personal equipment

Uniforms, load-carrying equipment, and personal protection equipment

 Uniformssystem M/11, Standard uniform system in MultiCam
 Oppakningssystem M/96, load carrying system (PLCE in Danish M/84 camouflage) (Used by Home guard)
 Beskyttelsesvest M/12, body armour (TYR Tactical PICO-MW DK)
 Hjelm M/12, helmet (Revision Cobra)
 Hjelm M/20, helmet (Galvion PDxT)
CBRN-maske M/18, Respirator (General Service Respirator)
CBRN-dragt M/??, CBRN-suit
Only used by Home guard:
 Uniformssystem M/84, Standard uniform system in Danish M/84 camouflage (Limited use)
 Hjelm M/96, (SPECTRA helmet) 
 Kampvest M/05, Assault Vest (Limited use)
 Fragmentationsvest M/00, body armour (Limited use)
 Beskyttelsesvest M/12, body armour (TYR Tactical PICO-MW) (Used by emergency preparedness)
 Hjelm M/12, helmet (Revision Cobra) (Used by emergency preparedness)

Tactical and communication equipment
 Sepura STP9000 Tetra (Garrison guard units and Conscripts)
 PRR M/07, Personnel Role Radio (Bowman) (Used by Conscripts but being phased out slowly by Sepura STP9000 Tetra)
 AN/PRC-152, (Harris Falcon III)
 RF-7800S SPR, Secure Personal Radio (Harris Falcon III)
 Nat-brille M/97, Binocular Night Vision Device (AN/PVS-7) (Used by Conscripts)
 Nat-brille M/03, Monocular Night Vision Device (AN/PVS-14)
 Nat-brille M/18, Monocular Night Vision Device (ARGUS FS)

Vehicles

Armoured

Artillery

Engineering and logistics

Aircraft
Helicopters
All army helicopters have been transferred to Helicopter Wing Karup, a joint helicopter command under the Royal Danish Air Force.

Unmanned aerial vehicles:

Other vehicles 
Trucks, lorries, and other vehicles

The MAN trucks are being replaced by Scania AB trucks.
MAN trucks of various models and versions, for instance:
 MAN HX 77  Armoured logistic vehicle
 MAN SX 45  Armoured logistic vehicle
 MAN  8.136 Light utility truck (phase out)
 MAN 13.192 Medium utility truck
 MAN 18.225 Medium utility truck
 MAN 27.314 Heavy utility truck
 MAN 26.372 Fuel truck
 MAN 25.322 Container handling truck
 MAN 27.314 Mobile communication center
 MAN 40.400 Prime MBT mover
 MAN 35.460 Heavy equipment transporter
 MAN 41.372 Heavy wrecker
 MAN 41.480 Recovery vehicle (TGA)
 MAN 41.480 Heavy equipment transporter (TGA)
 SCANIA G450 B8x8 HZ
Mercedes Geländewagen of various models and versions, for example: (over 2000)
 G240 Utility (phase out)
 G270 CDI Armoured utility
 G270 CDI Reconnaissance vehicle et al.
 G280 CDI Armoured utility
 G290 Ambulance et al.
 G300 EOD
Motorcycles: 
 BMW F650GS
 BMW R850RT
 Kawasaki KLR650
 KTM 450 EXC

See also
 List of Danish military equipment of World War II

References 

Royal Danish Army
Military equipment of Denmark
Denmark
Equipment